The Essentials is a posthumously produced compilation album by the American singer-songwriter Harry Chapin. It was released in 2002 containing a few of Chapin's hits.

Reception

Heather Phares praises the album saying, "The Essentials more or less lives up to its name, gathering a dozen definitive Harry Chapin songs" and concluding that the set "offers a decent primer of Chapin's best-known work."

Track listing

Personnel
Harry Chapin – vocals

References

2001 compilation albums
Harry Chapin albums
Compilation albums published posthumously